Carlo (or Carlino) Dolci (25 May 1616 – 17 January 1686) was an Italian painter of the Baroque period, active mainly in Florence, known for highly finished religious pictures, often repeated in many versions.

Biography
He was born in Florence, on his mother's side the grandson of a painter. He was precocious and apprenticed at a young age to Jacopo Vignali, and when only eleven years of age he attempted a whole figure of St John, and a head of the infant Christ, which received some approbation. However Dolci was not prolific. "He would take weeks over a single foot", according to his biographer Baldinucci. His painstaking technique made him unsuited for large-scale fresco painting. He painted chiefly sacred subjects, and his works are generally small in scale, although he made a few life-size pictures. He often repeated the same composition in several versions, and his daughter, Agnese Dolci, also made excellent copies of his works.

When only eleven years of age, he attempted a whole figure of St John, and a head of the infant Christ, which received some approbation. He afterwards painted a portrait of his mother, and displayed a new and delicate style which brought him into notice, and procured him extensive employment at Florence (from which city he hardly ever moved) and in other parts of Italy.

Dolci was known for his piety. It is said that every year during Passion Week he painted a half-figure of the Savior wearing the Crown of Thorns. In 1682, when he saw Giordano, nicknamed "fa presto" (quick worker), paint more in five hours than he could have completed in months, he fell into a depression.

Dolci's daughter, Agnese (died circa 1680), was also a painter. Dolci died in Florence in 1686.

Works

The grand manner, vigorous coloration or luminosity, and dynamic emotion of the Bolognese-Roman Baroque are foreign to Dolci and to Baroque Florence. While he fits into a long tradition of prestigious official Florentine painting, Dolci appears constitutionally blind to the new aesthetic, shackled by the Florentine tradition that holds each drawn figure under a microscope of academicism. Wittkower describes him as the Florentine counterpart, in terms of devotional imagery, of the Roman Sassoferrato. Pilkington declared his touch "inexpressibly neat ... though he has often been censured for the excessive labour bestowed on his pictures, and for giving his carnations more of the appearance of ivory than the look of flesh", a flaw that had been already apparent in Agnolo Bronzino.

Among his best works are a St Sebastian; the Four Evangelists at Florence; Christ Breaking the Bread; the St Cecilia at the Organ; an Adoration of the Magi in the National Gallery, London; the St Catherine Reading and St Andrew praying before his Crucifixion (1646) in the Palazzo Pitti. He completed his portrait of  Fra Ainolfo de' Bardi, when he was only sixteen. He also painted a large altarpiece (1656) for the church of Sant' Andrea Cennano in Montevarchi. As was typical for Florentine painters, this was a painting about painting, and in it the Virgin of Soriano holds a miraculous and iconic painting of St Dominic.

Gallery

Footnotes

References
 
Attribution:

External links 

 , engraved by William Ensom for The Easter Gift, 1832 with a poetical illustration by Letitia Elizabeth Landon.
 , engraved by S. Sangster for The Easter Gift, 1832 with a poetical illustration by Letitia Elizabeth Landon.
 , engraved by S. Sangster for The Easter Gift, 1832 with a poetical illustration by Letitia Elizabeth Landon.

1616 births
1686 deaths
17th-century Italian painters
Italian male painters
Painters from Florence
Italian Baroque painters